Old Man's Child is a Norwegian black metal band from the city of Oslo. The band is the brainchild of Galder (formerly known as Grusom; birth name: Thomas Rune Andersen) who is the only permanent member of the band.

History

Old Man's Child was officially founded in 1993, but its roots go back to 1989 when Galder, Jardar, and Tjodalv formed a death/thrash band called "Requiem". They originally played Slayer and Metallica covers but later released one demo album in 1990. "Requiem" dissolved in 1992.

In 1996, after they released their first full-length album Born of the Flickering, they signed to Century Media. After release of The Pagan Prosperity and Ill-Natured Spiritual Invasion through Century Media, the band went on one of their infrequent tours. Old Man's Child have rarely toured because of the constant line-up changes over the years.

In 2000 Galder went to play in Dimmu Borgir. However, Galder did not stop working with Old Man's Child. Over the years, Old Man's Child has become a one-man band with the addition of session members on albums.

Between 2000 and 2005, Galder released three albums: Revelation 666 – The Curse of Damnation (2000), In Defiance of Existence (2003) and Vermin (2005). In July 2008, Old Man's Child announced that they were entering the Studio to record their seventh studio album Slaves of the World. It was released in 2009.

In an early 2011 interview, Galder stated that he was firmly focused on the current Dimmu Borgir tour. However, he said that after the world tour he would start writing music for Old Man's Child with the possibility of an album release in 2012. This did not come to pass, and the band entered an extended period of silence during which Galder appeared to maintain his focus on Dimmu Borgir.

In December 2019, however, the group was reactivated with Galder posting a video on the band's Facebook page showing him working on new Old Man's Child material, the first such work in over a decade.

Discography

Studio albums
Born of the Flickering (1996)
The Pagan Prosperity (1997)
Ill-Natured Spiritual Invasion (1998)
Revelation 666 – The Curse of Damnation (2000)
In Defiance of Existence (2003)
Vermin (2005)
Slaves of the World (2009)

Compilations
The Historical Plague (2003)

Demos
In the Shades of Life (1994)

Splits
Sons of Satan Gather for Attack (with Dimmu Borgir — also known as "Devil's Path / In the Shades of Life") (1999)

Band members
Current members
 Galder – vocals, guitars, bass, keyboards (1993–present)

Former members
 Brynjard Tristan – bass (1994–1995)
 Frode "Gonde" Forsmo – bass (1995–1997)
 Stian Aarstad – keyboards (1996–1999)
 Kenneth "Tjodalv" Åkesson – drums (1993–1996, 1999–2001)
 Jon Øyvind "Jardar" Andersen  – guitars, backing vocals (1993–1997, 1999–2003)
 Bjørn Dencker Gjerde - vocals (1995-1996) 
 Tony Kirkemo – drums (1996–1997)
 Jan Roger "Grimar" Halvorsen – drums (1999-2000)

Former session musicians
 Gene Hoglan – drums (1998)
 Håkon "Memnoch" Didriksen – bass (2000)
 Nicholas Barker – drums (2003)
 Reno Kiilerich – drums (2005)
 Peter Wildoer – drums (2008)

Timeline

References

External links
Official Old Man's Child Myspace
Official Old Man's Child Forum

Norwegian black metal musical groups
Musical groups established in 1993
1993 establishments in Norway
Century Media Records artists
Musical groups from Oslo